In mathematics, a convergence space, also called a generalized convergence, is a set together with a relation called a  that satisfies certain properties relating elements of X with the family of filters on X.  Convergence spaces generalize the notions of convergence that are found in point-set topology, including metric convergence and uniform convergence. Examples of convergences that are in general non-topological include convergence in measure and almost everywhere convergence. Many topological properties have generalizations to convergence spaces.

Besides its ability to describe notions of convergence that topologies are unable to, the category of convergence spaces has an important categorical property that the category of topological spaces lacks. 
The category of topological spaces is not an exponential category (or equivalently, it is not Cartesian closed) although it is contained in the exponential category of pseudotopological spaces, which is itself a subcategory of the (also exponential) category of convergence spaces.

Definition and notation

Preliminaries and notation 

If  (resp. ) then  is said to be  (resp. ) in 

For any families  and  declare that 
 if and only if for every  there exists some  such that  

A  is a non-empty subset  that is upward closed in  closed under finite intersections, and does not have the empty set as an element (i.e. ). A  is any family of sets that is equivalent (with respect to subordination) to  filter or equivalently, it is any family of sets whose upward closure is a filter.

Definition of (pre)convergence spaces 

For any  if  then define

and if  then define

A  on a non-empty set  is a binary relation  with the following property:

: if  then  implies 

and if in addition it also has the following property:

: if  then 
 In words, for every  the principal/discrete ultrafilter at  converges to 

for all  This extended preconvergence will be isotone on  meaning that if  then  implies

Examples

Convergence induced by a topological space 

 if and only if  in  

Power 

Let  and  be topological spaces and let  denote the set of continuous maps   The  is the coarsest topology  on  that makes the natural coupling  into a continuous map  
The problem of finding the power has no solution unless  is locally compact. However, if searching for a convergence instead of a topology, then there always exists a convergence that solves this problem (even without local compactness). In other words, the category of topological spaces is not an exponential category (i.e. or equivalently, it is not Cartesian closed) although it is contained in the exponential category of pseudotopologies, which is itself a subcategory of the (also exponential) category of convergences.

Other named examples 

Standard convergence on ℝ The  is the convergence  on  defined for all  and all  by: 
 if and only if 

Discrete convergence The   on set non-empty  is defined for all  and all  by: 
 if and only if  

Empty convergence The   on set non-empty  is defined for all  by: 

Properties 

A preconvergence  on set non-empty  is called  or  if  is a singleton set for all   It is called  if  for all  and it is called  if  for all distinct   
Every  preconvergence on a finite set is Hausdorff.  Every  convergence on a finite set is discrete.

While the category of topological spaces is not exponential (i.e. Cartesian closed), it can be extended to an exponential category through the use of a subcategory of convergence spaces.

See also

Citations

References 

  
 
 
  

 
Mathematical structures